Zeyti-ye Do (also Romanized as Zeytī-ye Do; also known as Zeytī) is a village in Barez Rural District, Manj District, Lordegan County, Chaharmahal and Bakhtiari Province, Iran. At the 2006 census, its population was 40, in 8 families.

References 

Populated places in Lordegan County